Don Levingston Short (June 22, 1903 – May 10, 1982) was a cattle rancher and politician from Billings County, North Dakota. His career in politics reached its pinnacle when he was elected as a U.S. Representative in 1958, and was a member of the United States Congress from January 3, 1959 to January 3, 1965.

Biography
Don L. Short was born June 22, 1903 in Le Mars, Iowa to Hugh Connoran and Anne Otely Corkery Short. Less than a year later the family moved to North Dakota and what would become the Short Ranch. The ranch is located in Billings County, North Dakota; near the town of Medora where Short attended public schools. He also attended the St. James School in Faribault, Minnesota, and an agricultural short course at Montana State University at Bozeman. Short graduated from Pillsbury Military Academy, Owatonna, Minnesota, in 1921; and was a student at the University of Minnesota 1922-1926, where he joined Phi Kappa Psi. After attending college he returned to the Short Ranch. In 1929 he married Edith Esther Whittemore, a Medora school teacher. He made his living as a cattle rancher and farmer.

Don and Edith ran the ranch with their son Con Short (Buzzie) until the former congressman's health failed in his late 70s. He developed Alzheimer's in his last few years and became more and more uncomfortable outside of Beach, ND. He was a long-time resident of Beach.  He greatly enjoyed driving back and forth from Beach to the ranch in his later years to check on cattle and crops, until his death in Dickinson, N.D., on May 10, 1982. He was interred in the scenic Medora Cemetery, Medora. His gravestone is inscribed COWBOY, and sits on the top of a bluff overlooking town of Medora, next to the Medora Musical outdoor theater.

While in Washington, D.C. he became friends with George H. W. Bush and Richard Nixon in his time in the House of Representatives . He was remembered by ND political writer Darrell Dorgan, brother of Senator Byron Dorgan (D, ND) as one of the last true statesmen after his death in 1982.

Politics
Short began his career in politics as a County Supervisor for the Farm Security Administration from 1937 to 1938. In 1957 he became a member of the North Dakota House of Representatives. As a Republican candidate in 1958 he was elected as a member of the United States House of Representatives. He took office January 3, 1959 representing Dakota's 1st congressional district. He was a member of the Eighty-sixth, Eighty-seventh, and Eighty-eighth Congresses. He was an unsuccessful candidate for reelection in 1964 to the Eighty-ninth Congress. His defeat was attributed to the efforts of Senator Milton Young (a ND Republican Senator. Young actively and covertly worked to have Short defeated even refusing to endorse Short as he had eagerly had given his support in previous elections. Two years later, Short was asked to run for Congress again, but declined as he had moved back to tend to the ranch.

The nature of Don Short's and Milt Young's dispute was money versus stewardship. Milt Young and Don Short disagreed about the need for a highway through an unspoiled piece of America's scenic national treasure, The Badlands. Short voted against building a US highway through the National Grasslands. Young disagreed with him. Short's efforts won in the long run as no US highway was ever built and the land remains unspoiled and pristine.

Notes

External links

 
 

1903 births
1982 deaths
University of Minnesota alumni
People from Le Mars, Iowa
People from Billings County, North Dakota
Republican Party members of the North Dakota House of Representatives
Republican Party members of the United States House of Representatives from North Dakota
20th-century American politicians